Lalchhanhima Sailo (born 3 March 2003) is an Indian professional footballer who plays as a midfielder or winger for Aizawl in the I-League.

Club career

Indian Arrows
He made his I-League professional debut for Indian Arrows on 24 February 2020 at TRC Turf Ground against Real Kashmir F.C., he was brought in as substitute in the 72nd minute as they lost 1–0. He scored a goal for Arrows against Aizawl FC in which Arrows won the game by 2–1.

Aizawl
In August 2022, Sailo signed with fellow I-League club Aizawl for the 2022–23 season.

International
Sailo was part of the Indian U-16 team that reached the quarterfinals of the 2018 AFC U-16 Championship in Malaysia.

Career statistics

Club

Honours

International 
SAFF U-15 Championship
  Winners  (1):  2017

References

External links

2003 births
Living people
People from Mizoram
Indian footballers
Indian Arrows players
I-League players
Footballers from Mizoram
India youth international footballers
Association football midfielders